Everett Sterling Dean (March 18, 1898 – October 26, 1993) was an American college basketball and baseball coach.

Biography
Born in Livonia, Indiana, Dean played basketball for three years at Indiana University, where he was also a member of the Alpha Tau Omega fraternity, and was named the 1921 Helms Athletic Foundation All-America team. He began his coaching career at Carleton College.

Dean was the head baseball and basketball coach at his alma mater, Indiana University, from 1924 to 1938. In 1938, Dean was named head basketball coach at Stanford University, where he coached the team to the 1942 NCAA championship. Dean was named baseball coach at Stanford in 1950, and led Stanford's baseball team to the 1953 College World Series.

Dean is the only coach named to both the Naismith Basketball Hall of Fame and the College Baseball Hall of Fame. He was inducted into the Indiana Basketball Hall of Fame in 1965. He also has the distinction of being the first basketball All-American from Indiana University.

Dean wrote two books, Indiana Basketball in 1933 and Progressive Basketball in 1942.

His fondness for the local history of his native Washington County, Indiana led him to push for the creation of the John Hay Center of Salem, Indiana.

Head coaching record

Basketball

See also
 List of NCAA Division I Men's Final Four appearances by coach

References

Further reading
NCAA, NCAA March Madness: Cinderellas, Superstars, and Champions from the NCAA Men's Final Four : Chicago: Triumph Books, 2004.

External links

 
 

1898 births
1993 deaths
All-American college men's basketball players
American men's basketball coaches
American men's basketball players
Basketball coaches from Indiana
Basketball players from Indiana
Carleton Knights men's basketball coaches
College men's basketball head coaches in the United States
Indiana Hoosiers baseball coaches
Indiana Hoosiers men's basketball coaches
Indiana Hoosiers men's basketball players
Naismith Memorial Basketball Hall of Fame inductees
National Collegiate Basketball Hall of Fame inductees
People from Washington County, Indiana
Stanford Cardinal baseball coaches
Stanford Cardinal men's basketball coaches